Islamul Ahsan (born 8 October 1992) is a Bangladeshi cricketer. He made his first-class debut for Barisal Division in the 2011–12 National Cricket League on 17 October 2011.

References

External links
 

1992 births
Living people
Bangladeshi cricketers
Barisal Division cricketers
Agrani Bank Cricket Club cricketers
People from Patuakhali district